Serfs Up! is the third studio album by British post-punk band Fat White Family. It was released in April 2019 under Domino.

Track listing

Charts

References

2019 albums
Domino Recording Company albums